Al White is an American character actor.

Al White may also refer to:
Al White (politician), Republican member of the Colorado Senate
Albert White (diver) (1895–1982), American Olympic diver
Alvin S. White (1918–2006), American test pilot and USAF astronaut

See also
Alan White (disambiguation)
Albert White (disambiguation)
Alex White (disambiguation)
Alexander White (disambiguation)
Alfred White (disambiguation)